Sir James Patrick Ivan Hennessy   (born 26 September 1923) is a British retired diplomat and served as Her Majesty's Chief Inspector of Prisons from 1982 to 1987.

Early years 
Educated at Bedford School and then King's College, Durham (now part of Newcastle University), Hennessy joined the Royal Artillery in 1942, and was then seconded to the Indian Army from 1944 to 1946.

Career 
After World War II, Hennessy joined what was then HM Overseas Service, serving initially in Basutoland from 1948 in a number of roles, seconded in 1961 to the Office of the High Commissioner in Pretoria and taking on a number of positions in the government of South Africa. He retired from the Overseas Service in 1968 and was appointed to the Foreign Office, serving as Chargé d'Affaires to Montevideo, Uruguay for 1971–72, and then High Commissioner to Kampala, Uganda and non-resident Ambassador to Kigali, Rwanda, 1973–76. He served as Consul-General in Cape Town from 1977 to 1980, before ending his career as the last Governor and Commander-in-Chief of British Honduras (now Belize) from 1980 to 1981.

In 1982, Hennessy was appointed as the second ever HM Chief Inspector of Prisons, taking over from Bill Pearce, previously the Chief Inspector of Probation for Inner London whose tenure as HMCIP was cut short by illness. Hennessey served a five-year term until 1987. After stepping down as Chief Inspector to be replaced by Judge Sir Stephen Tumim, Hennessy served on the Parole Board for England and Wales until 1991 and as a Trustee of the Butler Trust until 1998.

Honours and recognition 
Hennessy was appointed a Member of the Order of the British Empire (MBE) in the 1959 New Year Honours, promoted to Officer of the Order of the British Empire (OBE) in the 1968 New Year Honours and to Knight Commander of the Order of the British Empire (KBE) in the 1982 New Year Honours. He was also made a Companion of the Order of St Michael and St George (CMG) in the 1975 New Year Honours.

References

Positions held 

British Indian Army personnel
Living people
1923 births
Members of HM Diplomatic Service
British businesspeople
Knights Commander of the Order of the British Empire
Companions of the Order of St Michael and St George
People educated at Bedford School
British prison inspectors
Governors of British Honduras
Ambassadors of the United Kingdom to Uruguay
High Commissioners of the United Kingdom to Uganda
Basutoland people
British Army personnel of World War II
British expatriates in Lesotho
Royal Artillery personnel
Indian Army personnel of World War II
20th-century British diplomats